Novichenko is a surname. Notable people with the surname include:

 Tamara Novichenko, Russian soprano
 Vitaly Novichenko (born 1975), Belarusian speed skater

See also
 

Ukrainian-language surnames